Miss America 1949, the 23rd Miss America pageant, was held at the Boardwalk Hall in Atlantic City, New Jersey on September 10, 1949. The 1949 pageant marked the first time that a public official, New Jersey Governor Alfred E. Driscoll, had taken part in the coronation, placing the jeweled crown on the new queen's head.

The winner, Jacque Mercer, was the first Miss Arizona to take the crown, as well as the last previously married woman before the Miss America pageant adopted new rules.

Among the finalists was Betty Jane Crowley, Miss New Jersey, who became an actress and guest-starred in dozens of television series, billed professionally as Kathleen Crowley. Another future actress, Allison Hayes, competed in the pageant as Miss District of Columbia.

In Philip Roth's 1997 novel, American Pastoral, Mary Dawn Dwyer (the future wife of main protagonist Seymour "Swede" Levov) was Miss New Jersey in the 1949 pageant, and did not make it to the Top 15, despite the contest being held in her home state. Roth recreates the pageant in the novel, and mentions real-life winner Jacque Mercer, as well as several of the judges.

Results

Awards

Preliminary awards

Other awards

Contestants

References

Secondary sources

 

Lillian Ross, "Symbol of all we possess (October 22, 1949 (On the Miss America pageant))" from "The 40s: The story of a decade: The New Yorker"
Edited by Henry Finder with Giles Harvey
Modern Library, New York
Copyright 2014 by The New Yorker Magazine

External links
 Miss America official website

1949
1949 beauty pageants
1949 in the United States
1949 in New Jersey
September 1949 events in the United States
Events in Atlantic City, New Jersey